A paperboy is someoneoften an older child or adolescentwho distributes printed newspapers to homes or offices on a regular route, usually by bicycle or automobile. In Western nations during the heyday of print newspapers during the early 20th century, this was often a young person's first job, perhaps undertaken before or after school. This contrasts with the newsboy or newspaper hawker, now extremely rare in Western nations, who would sell newspapers to passersby on the street, often with very vocal promotion. They were common when multiple daily papers in every cityas many as 50 in New York City alonecompeted.

History

The paperboy occupies a prominent place in the popular memory of many countries, including the United Kingdom, United States, Canada, Australia, New Zealand, Ireland, and Japan. This is because it has long been the first paying job available to young boys. Newspaper industry lore suggests that the first paperboy, hired in 1833, was 10-year-old Barney Flaherty who was hired after seeing an advertisement in the Sun News and signing up for the job.

The duties of a paperboy varied by distributor, but usually included counting and separating papers, rolling papers and inserting them in newspaper bags during inclement weather, and collecting payments from customers.

The number of paperboys experienced a major decline. This is due partly to the disappearance of afternoon newspapers, whose delivery times worked better for school-aged children than did those of morning papers, which were typically delivered before 6 a.m. The numbers have also been affected by changing demographics, the availability of news and newspapers on the Internet; employment laws (particularly the mid-20th century ban of child labour), and growing concerns for the safety of un-escorted children, all of which have led many newspapers to switch to delivery by adults. Today, they are mainly used by weekly community newspapers and free shopper papers, which still tend to be delivered in the afternoons. Alternatively, sometimes paperboys are only employed once a week to deliver the paper on Sunday. Many deliveries these days are by adults in cars, known as newspaper carriers. They have traditionally been hired by the newspapers as independent contractors.

See also 
 Bicycle messenger
 Child labour
 Newsagent's shop
 Newspaper Carrier Day
 Paperboys (documentary)
 Newspaper delivery bag

References

External links

 Preus Museum. Lewis Hine, Newspaperboys photos
 Vincent DiGirolamo, Crying the News: A History of America's Newsboys (Oxford University Press, 2019).

Newspaper distribution
Newspaper people
Informal occupations
Child labour
Children by occupation